The green turaco is a group of four taxa of turacos, which once were considered conspecific under the scientific name Tauraco persa, but now are treated as four separate species:

 Guinea (or green) turaco, Tauraco persa
 Schalow's turaco, Tauraco schalowi
 Livingstone's turaco, Tauraco livingstonii
 Knysna turaco, Tauraco corythaix

Turacos
Birds by common name